Pavel Vadimovich Krotov (born 24 April 1992) is a Russian freestyle skier, specializing in aerials.

Career
Krotov competed at the 2014 Winter Olympics for Russia. He placed 9th in the first qualifying round in the aerials, failing to advance. He subsequently placed 3rd in the second qualification round, enough to progress to the final. In the first jump of the three-jump final, he finished 10th, not enough to advance further.

As of April 2014, his best showing at the World Championships is 18th, in the 2011 aerials.

Krotov made his World Cup debut in January 2011. As of April 2014, he has one World Cup victory, at Mont Gabriel in 2011–12. His best World Cup overall finish in aerials is 8th, in 2013–14.

World Cup podiums

Individual podiums
 2 wins
 6 podiums

Team podiums
 1 wins
 4 podiums

References

External links

1992 births
Living people
Olympic freestyle skiers of Russia
Freestyle skiers at the 2014 Winter Olympics
Freestyle skiers at the 2018 Winter Olympics
Sportspeople from Yaroslavl
Russian male freestyle skiers